Marcel Vlad (born 5 February 1948) is a Romanian former wrestler who competed in the 1972 Summer Olympics.

References

1948 births
Living people
Olympic wrestlers of Romania
Wrestlers at the 1972 Summer Olympics
Romanian male sport wrestlers
Place of birth missing (living people)